Jan-Peder Falk (born 20 September 1947) is a Swedish actor, screenwriter and director. He has worked for Stockholm's stadsteater for most of his career, and is most known for his role at Carl Gripenhieln in the soap opera Nya tider, and for the role as cabinet secretary Peter Sorman in the show Fiendens fiende. Falk studied in Umeå during the late 1960s, he during a period of time worked as a reporter for Västerbottens Folkblad newspaper. After he had finished his studies at Scenskolan in Malmö between 1969 and 1973 he did children's theater in Norrköping. In 1973 he started working for Stockholm's stadsteater, were his first role was in IK Kamraterna a play about football. He has as well at times worked for Klara Soppteater and Vetenskapsteatern. He has since the early 1990s written several plays and directed revue shows as well as plays.

In the mid 1980s, Falk along with Helge Skoog brought improvisation theater to Stockholm's stadsteater, a form of theater that Falk would continue to work with also in other medias as a panel member of the Sveriges Radio show På minuten. In the late 1980s he started to get roles in TV.-series and films. The film Svart gryning about the case of Dagmar Hagelin was the first. TV-series like Fiendens fiende, Goltuppen and Nya tider would come next. He acted as the character "Carl Gripenhielm" for 435 episodes of the soap opera Nya tider.

References

External links 

Living people
1947 births
20th-century Swedish writers
Male actors from Stockholm